Eric DeBari Junge (born January 5, 1977) is an American former professional baseball pitcher. He played in Major League Baseball (MLB) for the Philadelphia Phillies. He later became manager of the Lake Elsinore Storm, a Single A affiliate of the San Diego Padres.

Playing career
Junge graduated from Rye High School in Rye, New York. Junge attended Bucknell University, graduating with a degree in business administration.  

Junge was  drafted by the Los Angeles Dodgers in the 11th round of the 1999 amateur draft and was then traded to the Philadelphia Phillies in 2001. He appeared in 10 games for the Phillies in 2002 and 2003. He made his Major League debut on September 11, 2002.  His first win came 3 days later on September 14, in a win against the Pittsburgh Pirates in Philadelphia's Veterans Stadium.  His second career win, less than a week later was against the Atlanta Braves, came in a relief appearance lasting 4.2 innings.  The losing pitcher that day was Tom Glavine.  Junge owns a career record in the Major Leagues of 2-0, posting a 2.21 E.R.A.   Since then, he has played in the minor league systems of the New York Mets, San Diego Padres, New York Yankees and Los Angeles Angels of Anaheim.

On February 26, 2008, he was signed by the Orix Buffaloes of Japan's Pacific League. After starting the 2009 season with the Lancaster Barnstormers of the independent Atlantic League, on  July 9 he signed with the Hanwha Eagles of the South Korean Professional Baseball League.  In September 2009, he signed with the Navegantes del Magallanes of the Venezuelan winter league.  

On June 30, 2010, he signed a minor league deal with the Los Angeles Angels of Anaheim. On November 6, 2010, he was granted free agency by the Angels.  On January 28, 2011, he was re-signed by Anaheim with an invite to Major League spring training camp in Tempe, Arizona. Junge spent the majority of his final season as a player in 2012 pitching for the Atlanta Braves AAA affiliate in Gwinnett, GA.

Coaching career
In January 2013, Junge retired as an active player and was subsequently hired as Advanced Major League scout in the San Diego Padres front office and remained in that role for two seasons. Junge spent 2015 through 2017 as a Minor League Pitching Instructor in the Padres organization. He was promoted to Pitching Coordinator prior to the 2018 season. In January of 2022, Junge was named as manager of the Lake Elsinore Storm minor league affiliate of the Padres.

References

External links

Career statistics and player information from Korea Baseball Organization

1977 births
Living people
American expatriate baseball players in Japan
American expatriate baseball players in South Korea
American expatriate baseball players in Taiwan
Baseball players from New York (state)
Binghamton Mets players
Bridgeport Bluefish players
Major League Baseball pitchers
Clearwater Threshers players
Florida Complex League Phillies players
Jacksonville Suns players
Lancaster Barnstormers players
Norfolk Tides players
Orix Buffaloes players
Philadelphia Phillies players
Portland Beavers players
Navegantes del Magallanes players
American expatriate baseball players in Venezuela
San Bernardino Stampede players
Scranton/Wilkes-Barre Red Barons players
Scranton/Wilkes-Barre Yankees players
Yakima Bears players
KBO League pitchers
Hanwha Eagles players
Sinon Bulls players
Salt Lake Bees players
Bucknell Bison baseball players
Gwinnett Braves players
Colorado Springs Sky Sox players